Japeth Paul Cabrera Aguilar (born January 25, 1987) is a Filipino professional basketball player for the Barangay Ginebra San Miguel of the Philippine Basketball Association (PBA). He first played college basketball for the Ateneo Blue Eagles of the University Athletic Association of the Philippines (UAAP), but after two seasons, he moved to the Western Kentucky University Hilltoppers in the Division I of the National Collegiate Athletic Association in the United States.

College career

UAAP
Japeth Aguilar suited up as a college freshman for the Ateneo de Manila University Blue Eagles in the University Athletic Association of the Philippines in 2004. However, his first season stint was cut short due to appendicitis, but still managed to score 13 points, grab 11 rebounds and block 10 shots in 55 minutes of action in 10 games.

On his sophomore year, he bounced back from a disappointing first season as he averaged 5.7 points, 9.3 rebounds and 3.2 blocked shots per contest to help lead the Blue Eagles to a 10–4 finish in 2005. He scored in double digits on three occasions, while he just missed a double-double twice after posting nine points and a career-best 10 boards in Ateneo's season opener as well as 10 points and eight rebounds later in the year in a win over Far Eastern University. Aguilar shot a high 55.4 percent from the field for the season, and he was credited with multiple blocks in 12 of the Blue Eagles’ 16 games — that included a career high of seven as well as two other contest with five or more. He led the University Athletic Association of the Philippines in rejections during his sophomore season, with a total of 48 blocks in 16 games.

NCAA Division I

Japeth Aguilar later transferred to Western Kentucky University, where he saw action with the Hilltoppers mostly as a reserve. He entered the NCAA as a junior in 2007. During the season, he posted eight points, eight rebounds, four blocked shots, three assists and two steals in just 32 minutes of action in the Hilltopper's first two contests. He recorded four points, three rebounds, two assists and two steals in his collegiate début against Kennesaw State on November 9, 2007. He then collected two points, five rebounds and a game-best three blocks on November 13 against Kentucky Wesleyan. He was injured in practice after the victory over Kentucky Wesleyan and missed the rest of the year.

Return to the Philippines

Powerade Team Pilipinas
After his stint with the Hilltoppers and NBA tryouts, Aguilar returned to the Philippines to join the Gilas program to represent the Philippines coached by then Rajko Toroman and Chot Reyes mentored that captured the silver medal in 2013 FIBA Asia Cup in Manila and earned the berth that represented the country in World Basketball in Spain, which brings back the glory days of Philippine basketball in International Scene. Nonetheless, He played one of the vital cog in that tournament. Since he was not selected in the NBA draft – Nevertheless,  he left the land of promise, pursued his basketball career in the PBA and became the first pick overall in the 2009 PBA draft.

PBA and Smart Gilas

As expected, the Burger King Whoppers nabbed Aguilar as its overall No.1 draft pick in the 2009 PBA draft; however days after the draft, he boldly declared that he would join the Smart Gilas Pilipinas developmental basketball program coached by Serbian Rajko Toroman, a move which caused controversy within the PBA and angst especially by the team that drafted him.  PBA Governor Lito Alvarez even went to the extent of banning Aguilar from the league for his refusal to sign with the Whoppers.

An amicable settlement was reached on October 9, 2009, two days before the 35th PBA season.  With SBP president Manny Pangilinan and executive director Noli Eala intervening and at Alvarez's behest, Aguilar signed the one-year contract with the Whoppers. The deal required him to play a few games with the Burger King Whoppers after which he would be traded to Talk 'N Text Tropang Texters (Pangilinan's PBA team), which in turn would release him to Smart Gilas. Alvarez also pointed out that the No. 18 uniform was ready even before Aguilar signed the contract.

Aguilar played his only professional game with the Whoppers against the Purefoods Tender Juicy Giants in the PBA season opener, which ended in a 93–80 loss to the Giants. Immediately after, Aguilar got his wish as the Whoppers traded him to the Tropang Texters in exchange for future draft picks, indirectly through Barako Bull Energy Boosters which acted as the conduit team.  As expected, TNT loaned him to Smart Gilas where he stayed until after the 2012 London Olympics Asian Qualifier as per his Gilas contract.

Pursuing the NBA dream
Aguilar is the first player born and raised in the Philippines to ever receive an invitation to work out with an NBA team.

Days before the evaluation, Aguilar attended some open workouts hosted by the Bakersfield Jam of the NBA Development League. Aguilar's team lost but he had managed to put up some notable statistics. He finished the game with 10 points (shooting five from nine field goal attempts), five blocks, four rebounds and an assist. His performance also included three dunks.

In late September 2012, Aguilar was invited to a two-day workout with the New Orleans Hornets.

Shortly after, in early October 2012, Aguilar worked out with NBA D-League team, the Santa Cruz Warriors. The Warriors expressed that they would draft him if he was still available when their turn came in the draft.

2012 NBA D-League draft
He was the 109th overall draft pick of the 2012 NBA D-League draft; drafted 13th in the 7th round.

Santa Cruz Warriors
On November 2, Japeth Aguilar's pursuit of his NBA dream got closer to reality after he became the first ever Filipino to be drafted in the NBA Development League. Santa Cruz Warriors, the D-League affiliate of the Golden State Warriors in the NBA, selected Aguilar as the thirteenth pick in the seventh round, selected as 109th overall out of 139 players. Aguilar, who attended a series of workouts with several NBA teams before joining the NBA D-League draft, was described as a "work in progress" by the New Orleans Hornets talent scout Don Sellers.

After surviving two cuts, Santa Cruz Warriors waived Aguilar on November 22.

On December 5, Japeth Aguilar signs a Practice Player Contract with Santa Cruz Warriors, Japeth Aguilar has not given up on his attempt to make it into the NBA. After being the last man cut from the NBA D-League team, the Santa Cruz Warriors, he was offered a spot on the practice line-up which he has now put a signature on. Aguilar now hopes that he can slowly make his way onto the active line-up and then make some heads turn to maybe make an NBA team.

Return to PBA
After a failed attempt to play in NBA, he requested a trade from the Talk 'N Text Tropang Texters. He was then traded to GlobalPort Batang Pier for Rabeh Al-Hussaini. On June 11, 2013, GlobalPort was part of a 4-team trade and Aguilar was sent to Barangay Ginebra San Miguel.

Barangay Ginebra San Miguel (2013–present)
Aguilar was paired with Greg Slaughter and they were dubbed the "Twin Towers". He is able to show his athleticism and jumping ability by routinely making a dunk almost every game and swatting shots.

In his first game for the Kings, Aguilar tallied 18 points, 8 rebounds and 5 blocks against San Mig Super Coffee Mixers. He tallied his first double-double the next game against the Rain or Shine Elasto Painters by logging 19 points and 10 rebounds.
 
In a December 8, 2013, game against his former team Talk 'N Text Tropang Texters, Aguilar knocked down a 3-point shot to give the Kings a 97–95 lead with 1.1 seconds remaining. In the subsequent play, he blocked the game-tying field goal attempt by Ranidel de Ocampo to secure the victory. He finished the game with 21 points, 12 rebounds and 7 blocks in 38 minutes.

On December 28, 2013, against the Meralco Bolts, he knocked down the game winning 3 point shot at the buzzer to attain an 83–82 victory. He finished the game with 15 points and 11 rebounds.

With his newfound confidence, he now leads the team in scoring, and is one of the leading candidates for Best Player of the Conference trophy in the 2013–14 PBA Philippine Cup, trailing statistical points leader June Mar Fajardo.

On October 14, 2016, he was recognized during the PBA Leo Awards Night as he was named to the PBA All-Defensive Team and PBA Mythical Second Team.

On January 6, 2022, Aguilar signed a three-year contract extension with Barangay Ginebra.

Career statistics

PBA

As of the end of 2021 season

Season-by-season averages

|-
| align=left | 
| align=left | Burger King
| 1 || 24.0 || .333 || .000 || .600 || 9.0 || 2.0 || .0 || 1.0 || 10.0
|-
| align=left | 
| align=left | Talk 'N Text
| 52 || 15.4 || .450 || .125 || .664 || 4.1 || .5 || .3 || 1.3 || 6.6
|-
| align=left rowspan=2| 
| align=left | GlobalPort
| rowspan=2|18 || rowspan=2|25.2 || rowspan=2|.420 || rowspan=2|.267 || rowspan=2|.667 || rowspan=2|6.2 || rowspan=2|1.1 || rowspan=2|.4 || rowspan=2|1.8 || rowspan=2|9.6 
|-
| align=left | Barangay Ginebra
|-
| align=left | 
| align=left | Barangay Ginebra
| 43 || 30.4 || .508 || .200 || .668 || 7.6 || 1.1 || .3 || 2.1 || 13.7
|-
| align=left | 
| align=left | Barangay Ginebra
| 33 || 25.0 || .521 || .400 || .724 || 7.6 || .8 || .3 || 1.5 || 11.6
|-
| align=left | 
| align=left | Barangay Ginebra
| 49 || 30.4 || .499 || .267 || .682 || 7.0 || 1.4 || .5 || 1.7 || 13.7
|-
| align=left | 
| align=left | Barangay Ginebra
| 62 || 29.8 || .506 || .234 || .686 || 7.8 || 1.5 || .3 || 1.9 || 13.9
|-
| align=left | 
| align=left | Barangay Ginebra
| 52 || 28.4 || .553 || .270 || .691 || 7.0 || 1.8 || .5 || 1.2 || 16.4
|-
| align=left | 
| align=left | Barangay Ginebra
| 52 || 27.9 || .562 || .375 || .593 || 6.8 || 1.7 || .5 || 1.6 || 14.5
|-
| align=left | 
| align=left | Barangay Ginebra
| 22 || 29.8 || .573 || .250 || .615 || 8.3 || 1.3 || .5 || 1.4 || 15.6
|-
| align=left | 
| align=left | Barangay Ginebra
| 25 || 27.9 || .541 || .000 || .692 || 5.4 || 1.0 || .4 || 1.4 || 13.0
|-class=sortbottom
| align="center" colspan="2" | Career
| 409 || 27.0 || .520 || .258 || .669 || 6.8 || 1.3 || .4 || 1.6 || 13.0
|}

National team

|-
| align=left | 2009 FIBA Asia Championship
| align=left rowspan="11" | 
| 6 || 13.5 || .526 || .000 || .667 || 3.5 || 0.5 || 0.2 || 0.2 || 4.3
|-
| align=left | 2011 William Jones Cup
| 9 || 21.5 || .545 || .000 || .647 || 4.0 || 1.1 || 0.4 || 1.9 || 6.6
|-
| align=left | 2011 FIBA Asia Championship
| 5 || 8.2 || .565 || .000 || .700 || 3.2 || 0.0 || 0.4 || 0.2 || 6.6
|-
| align=left | 2013 FIBA Asia Championship
| 9 || 15.0 || .541 || .000 || .800 || 3.9 || 0.1 || 0.1 || 0.9 || 5.8
|-
| align=left | 2014 FIBA Asia Cup
| 6 || 13.7 || .500 || .000 || .625 || 2.8 || 0.5 || 0.5 || 0.9 || 5.2
|-
| align=left | 2014 FIBA Basketball World Cup
| 4 || 7.5 || .400 || .000 || .500 || 1.5 || 0.0 || 0.0 || 0.0 || 2.5
|-
| align=left | 2016 FIBA World Olympic Qualifying Tournament
| 1 || 2.3 || .000 || .000 || .000 || 0.0 || 0.0 || 0.0 || 0.0 || 0.0
|-
| align=left | 2017 FIBA Asia Cup
| 6 || 23.5 || .389 || .500 || .583 || 6.3 || 1.2 || 0.0 || 1.8 || 6.0
|-
| align=left | 2019 FIBA Basketball World Cup qualification
| 11 || 16.2 || .524 || .200 || .706 || 3.4 || 0.5 || 0.4 || 0.8 || 5.2
|-
| align=left | 2019 FIBA Basketball World Cup
| 5 || 20.9 || .367 || .250 || .500 || 3.0 || 1.0 || 0.0 || 0.2 || 4.8
|-
| align=left | 2019 Southeast Asian Games
| 5 || 13.4 || .625 || .000 || .560 || 5.4 || 0.6 || 0.2 || 0.6 || 7.0

NCAA

|-
| align=left | 2007–2008
| align=left rowspan="2" | Western Kentucky
| 3 ||  || 13.3 || .400 || .000 || 0.8|| 3.3 || 1.0 || 1.0 || 1.3 || 2.7
|-
| align=left | 2008–2009
| 14 ||  || 5.1 || .563 || .000 || 0.6|| 0.9 || 0.0 || 0.1 || 0.4 || 1.5

Esports 
In 2018, Japeth Aguilar became a Mobile Legends: Bang Bang ambassador for the LIGA event relating the esport game to basketball. Aguilar said that MLBB shares common characteristics with basketball where players form a bond and work together as a team.

Personal life
Aguilar's father, Peter, was also a basketball player in the PBA. In October 2019, Aguilar married his longtime girlfriend and former beauty queen Cassandra Naidas.

References

External links
 WKUSports.com – Japeth Aguilar Player Profile
 CBSSports.com – NCAA Basketball – Japeth Aguilar

1987 births
Living people
2014 FIBA Basketball World Cup players
2019 FIBA Basketball World Cup players
Asian Games competitors for the Philippines
Ateneo Blue Eagles men's basketball players
Barako Bull Energy draft picks
Barako Bull Energy players
Barangay Ginebra San Miguel players
Basketball players at the 2010 Asian Games
Basketball players at the 2014 Asian Games
Basketball players from Pampanga
Centers (basketball)
Competitors at the 2019 Southeast Asian Games
Filipino expatriate basketball people in the United States
Filipino men's basketball players
Kapampangan people
Mapúa University alumni
NorthPort Batang Pier players
Philippine Basketball Association All-Stars
Philippines men's national basketball team players
Power forwards (basketball)
Small forwards
Southeast Asian Games competitors for the Philippines
Southeast Asian Games gold medalists for the Philippines
Southeast Asian Games medalists in basketball
TNT Tropang Giga players
Western Kentucky Hilltoppers basketball players